Hurunui District Council is the territorial authority for the Hurunui District of New Zealand.

The council is led by the mayor of Hurunui, who is currently . There are also eight ward councillors.

Composition

Councillors

 Mayor 
 East Ward: Vince Daly, Fiona Harris
 West Ward: Nicky Anderson, Ross Barnes, Lynda Murchison, Mary Holloway
 South Ward: Robbie Bruerton, Geoff Shier, Michael Ward, Pauline White

History

The council was formed in 1989. Its predecessors include Ashley County Council (1876-1977), Amuri County Council (1876-1989), Cheviot County Council (1876-1989), Hurunui County Council (1977-1989) and Waipara County Council (1909-1977).

In 2020, the council had 185 staff, including 21 earning more than $100,000. According to the right-wing Taxpayers' Union think tank, residential rates averaged $3,040.

References

External links

 Official website

Hurunui District
Politics of Canterbury, New Zealand
Territorial authorities of New Zealand